Tanjung Datu-class patrol vessel is a class of patrol boat operated by Bakamla (Indonesian Maritime Security Agency).

History 
Tanjung Datu-class ship was built by PT Palindo Marine beginning on 15 March 2016. The construction took 636 days to complete. It is officially in service in Monday, 18 January 2018.

On 13 December 2020, KN Tanjung Datu saved a Chinese fishing ship adrift in the North Natuna sea. The ship, Lu Rong Yuan Yu 168, had a broken rudder. Tanjung Datu crew made a repair and the ship was escorted out of Indonesia's EEZ.

Following the dispute in the South China Sea, KN Tanjung Datu have dispelled approximately 31 to a maximum of 64 fishing boats (in single occasion) escorted by 3 Chinese Coast Guard vessels in the North Natuna Sea.

See also 

 Haixun-class cutter

References

Patrol ship classes